Breaker Mountain is a mountain located on the border of Alberta and British Columbia. It is part of the Waputik Range.  It was named in 1917 by Arthur O. Wheeler for the resemblance of a cornice on its summit to a breaking wave.

See also
 List of peaks on the Alberta–British Columbia border
 List of mountains in the Canadian Rockies

References

Three-thousanders of Alberta
Three-thousanders of British Columbia
Mountains of Banff National Park